Mashiz Rural District is a rural district (dehestan) in the Central District of Bardsir County, Kerman Province, Iran. At the 2006 census, its population was 18,900, in 4,198 families. The rural district has 114 villages.

References 

Rural Districts of Kerman Province
Bardsir County